Kırköy is a village in the Kale District of Denizli Province in Turkey.

References

Villages in Kale District